The tenth season of Blue Bloods, a police procedural drama series created by Robin Green and Mitchell Burgess, premiered on CBS September 27, 2019, with the first episode of the season celebrating the series' milestone 200th episode. Each season typically has 22 episodes, but due to production being halted during the COVID-19 pandemic, episode 19 served as the de facto season 10 finale.

Cast
Donnie Wahlberg (Danny Reagan), Bridget Moynahan (Erin Reagan), Will Estes (Jamie Reagan), and Len Cariou (Henry Reagan) are first credited. Sami Gayle (Nicky Reagan-Boyle) is credited next, marking the sixth season she has been included in the opening credits. (Gayle left the show after Episode 5 but returned for Episode 16.) Tom Selleck (Frank Reagan) receives an "and" billing at the close of the main title sequence.

Marisa Ramirez, as Danny's partner Detective Maria Baez, and Vanessa Ray, as Jamie's former partner (now wife) Eddie Janko-Reagan, continue to receive "also starring" billing for season 10. Gregory Jbara as Deputy Commissioner of Public Information Garrett Moore, Robert Clohessy as Lt. Sidney Gormley, and Abigail Hawk as Detective Abigail Baker, Frank's primary aide, appear regularly and receive "special guest star" billing.

Main cast 
Tom Selleck as NYPD Police Commissioner Francis "Frank" Reagan
Donnie Wahlberg as Detective 1st Grade Daniel "Danny" Reagan
Bridget Moynahan as ADA Erin Reagan
Will Estes as Sergeant Jamison "Jamie" Reagan
Len Cariou as Henry Reagan
Sami Gayle as Nicole "Nicky" Reagan-Boyle
Marisa Ramirez as Detective 1st Grade Maria Baez 
Vanessa Ray as Officer Edit "Eddie" Janko-Reagan

Recurring cast 
Abigail Hawk as Detective 1st Grade Abigail Baker
Gregory Jbara as Deputy Commissioner of Public Information Garrett Moore
Robert Clohessy as Lieutenant Sidney "Sid" Gormley
Stacey Keach as Archbishop Kevin Kearns
Steve Schirripa as DA Investigator Anthony Abetemarco
Lauren Patten as Officer Rachel Witten
Peter Hermann as Jack Boyle
Tony Terraciano as Jack Reagan 
Andrew Terraciano as Sean Reagan 
Treat Williams as Lenny Ross 
Callie Thorne as Maggie Gibson

Guest cast 
Will Hochman as Detective 3rd Grade Joseph "Joe" Hill
Bonnie Somerville as Paula Hill
Whoopi Goldberg as Regina Thomas
Lyle Lovett as Texas Ranger Waylon Gates

Episodes

Ratings

References

External links
 
 

Blue Bloods (TV series)
2019 American television seasons
2020 American television seasons
Television productions suspended due to the COVID-19 pandemic